Pygmarrhopalites is a genus of springtails belonging to the family Arrhopalitidae.

The species of this genus are found in Europe and Northern America.

Species

Species:

Pygmarrhopalites aggtelekiensis 
Pygmarrhopalites alticolus 
Pygmarrhopalites altus

References

Collembola
Springtail genera